A Miyake event is a powerful burst of cosmic rays. The origin and cause of these increases in cosmic ray activity is currently unknown. The outbreaks are marked in particular by the increase in the carbon isotope C14 in tree rings, meaning the events can be dendrochronologically dated. The events take place roughly every 1000 years on average. The last such eruptions took place around 7176BCE, 5410BCE, 5259BCE, 663BCE, 774CE and around 993CE. According to studies by Australian physicist Benjamin Pope, some of the eruptions were short-lived, while others lasted for years. According to Pope, an eruption occurring in the near future would have significant impacts on global infrastructure such as satellites, internet cables, and power grids.

Discovery 
The events are named after the Japanese astronomer Fusa Miyake, who published the first results of such radiation bursts in 2012 in the journal Nature. The investigation at that time found a strong C14 increase in the annual rings of Japanese cedars for the years 774/775 (see 774–775 carbon-14 spike).

Bibliography 

 Fusa Miyake, Kentaro Nagaya, Kimiaki Masuda, Toshio Nakamura: A signature of cosmic-ray increase in ad 774-775 from tree rings in Japan. In: Nature 486 (2012), pp. 240-242.
 Qingyuan Zhang, Utkarsh Sharma, Jordan A. Dennis et al.: Modeling cosmic radiation events in the tree-ring radiocarbon record. In: Proceedings of the Royal Society Vol. 478, No. 2266 (October 2022), doi : 10.1098/rspa.2022.0497 .

References 

Earth sciences
Astrophysics
Geophysics